Alphabetic code may refer to:

 Alphabetic code  as used in education;
 Alphabetic principle  the basis for alphabetic writing systems;
 Huffman coding using letters as symbols;
 ISO 4217  codes for currency and funds units;
 Country code  any of several systems codes to represent countries and other geographic areas;
 ISO 3166-1  a specific set of codes for different countries
 Federal_Reserve_Bank#Banks  codes for the different districts in the US Federal Reserve banking system